Oregon Route 194 is an Oregon state highway running from OR 223 near Dallas to OR 99W and OR 51 in Monmouth. OR 194 is known as the Monmouth Highway No. 194 (see Oregon highways and routes).

OR 194 was established in 2002 as part of Oregon's project to assign route numbers to highways that previously were not assigned, and, as of July 2018, remains unsigned.  Oddly, the four ODOT bridge inventory signs along the highway list the route number as "US 51," suggesting it may eventually be signed instead as an extension of Oregon Route 51.

Route description 

OR 194 begins at an intersection with OR 223 approximately five miles south of Dallas.  It heads east to an intersection with OR 99W and OR 51 in Monmouth, where it ends.

History 

OR 194 was assigned to the Monmouth Highway in 2002.

Major intersections

References 
 Oregon Department of Transportation, Descriptions of US and Oregon Routes, https://web.archive.org/web/20051102084300/http://www.oregon.gov/ODOT/HWY/TRAFFIC/TEOS_Publications/PDF/Descriptions_of_US_and_Oregon_Routes.pdf, page 27.
 Oregon Department of Transportation, Monmouth Highway No. 194, ftp://ftp.odot.state.or.us/tdb/trandata/maps/slchart_pdfs_1980_to_2002/Hwy194_1997.pdf

194
Monmouth, Oregon
Transportation in Polk County, Oregon
2002 establishments in Oregon